Jagat Ram Soondh was a leader of Indian National Congress from Punjab, India. He was a member of Punjab Legislative Assembly and a minister. He was shot dead by militants in 1988.

References

Year of birth missing
1988 deaths
Victims of Sikh terrorism
Members of the Punjab Legislative Assembly
People from Nawanshahr
People murdered in Punjab, India
Victims of the insurgency in Punjab
Assassinated Indian politicians
Indian National Congress politicians from Punjab, India